Niévroz is a commune in the Ain department in eastern France.

Population

The inhabitants are known as Nièvrants.

See also
Communes of the Ain department

References

Communes of Ain
Ain communes articles needing translation from French Wikipedia